Eduardo Endtner (11 June 1942 – 5 August 1995) was a Brazilian rower. He competed in the men's coxed four event at the 1960 Summer Olympics.

References

1942 births
1995 deaths
Brazilian male rowers
Olympic rowers of Brazil
Rowers at the 1960 Summer Olympics